Kevin Tyler (born 26 September 1963) is a Canadian former bobsledder. He competed in the two man and the four man events at the 1988 Winter Olympics.

References

External links
 

1963 births
Living people
Canadian male bobsledders
Olympic bobsledders of Canada
Bobsledders at the 1988 Winter Olympics
Sportspeople from New Westminster